Gamma-aminobutyric acid receptor subunit epsilon is a protein that in humans is encoded by the GABRE gene.

The product of this gene belongs to the ligand-gated ionic channel (TC 1.A.9) family. It encodes the gamma-aminobutyric acid (GABA) A receptor which is a multisubunit chloride channel that mediates the fastest inhibitory synaptic transmission in the central nervous system. This gene encodes an epsilon subunit. It is mapped to chromosome Xq28 in a cluster of genes encoding alpha 3, beta 4 and theta subunits of the same receptor. Alternatively spliced transcript variants encoding different isoforms have been identified.

Brainstem expression of ε subunit-containing GABAA receptors is upregulated during pregnancy, particularly in the ventral respiratory group.

See also
 GABAA receptor

References

Further reading

External links 
 

Ion channels